Oxton is a village and civil parish in the Selby District of North Yorkshire, England, and about  south-west from the county town and city of York. The parish touches Bolton Percy, Grimston, Kirkby Wharfe with North Milford, Steeton and Tadcaster. In 2001 the parish had a population of 20.

The name "Oxton" means 'Ox farm/settlement', and was recorded in the Domesday Book as "Ositone". Within the parish is the deserted medieval village of Oulston.

Oxton was formerly a township in the parish of Tadcaster, and in 1866 became a civil parish in its own right.

There are two Grade II listed buildings in Oxton, the mid-18th-century Oxton Grange, and the early 18th-century Oxton Hall.

References 

Villages in North Yorkshire
Civil parishes in North Yorkshire
Selby District